The Alaska Land Transfer Acceleration Act was a law passed on December 10, 2004. It was an attempt to resolve the conflicting land claims of three groups in time for the fiftieth anniversary of Alaska's statehood in 2009. The sections were divided into titles.

Titles

Title I was an attempt to speed up the State selection process.

Title II was an attempt to finalize the Regional and Village Corporation land selections under ANCSA.

Title III.

Title IV. This stated the deadlines.

Title V. The act authorized the Secretary of the Interior to create a field office of DOI's Office of Hearings and Appeals in Alaska to handle disputes related to the Alaska land transfers.

Title VI. The act required the Secretary of the Interior, to deliver to Congress a report within three years of the bill's passage. The report had to detail the progress on the Alaska land transfers. Finally, the act made actions necessary in carrying out the Act legal.

References

2004 in Alaska
Acts of the 108th United States Congress
Aboriginal title in the United States